Ahmadabad (also Romanized as Aḩmadābād) is a village in Shahidabad Rural District, Mashhad-e Morghab District, Khorrambid County, Fars Province, Iran. At the 2006 census, its population was 128, in 35 families.

References 

Populated places in Khorrambid County